Cameron Dummigan (born 2 June 1996) is a Northern Irish professional footballer who plays as a defender for League of Ireland Premier Division side Derry City.

Club career
Born in Lurgan, County Armagh, Dummigan attended St Paul's Junior High School in the town and played for junior side Sunnyside and local GAA side St Pauls 
http://www.stpaulsgaalurgan.com/ 

winning leagues and championships at all levels before signing for Cliftonville. In July 2012, he was recruited by Championship side Burnley, signing a two-year scholarship with the club. Dummigan impressed during his time in the youth team winning the Player of the Year Award in his first season with the club. In the 2013–14 season he was fast-tracked into the Development Squad and also featured on the bench as an unused substitute for first team matches against Watford and Southampton. In April 2014, he signed his first professional contract, signing a two-year deal until 2016.

Dummigan was promoted to the first team in the summer of 2014 after Burnley had won promotion to the Premier League, and was an unused substitute for the opening game against Chelsea, which ended in a 3–1 defeat. He did however spend the majority of the season playing with the Development Squad featuring in friendlies. He started the 2015–16 season as back-up right back to Tendayi Darikwa, following the injury to Matt Lowton in pre-season, featuring on the bench for the first two games of the season. In October 2015, he was sent out on loan to League One side Oldham Athletic on a one-month youth loan deal. He made his professional debut in the 3–3 draw away to Gillingham, playing the full ninety minutes.

At the end of the 2017–18 season, when Oldham were relegated to League Two, the club exercised an option to extend his contract.

On 7 December 2021, he signed a 2 year contract with League of Ireland Premier Division side Derry City, after 3 years with Dundalk.

International career
Dummigan has been capped at under-17, under-19 and under-21 level for Northern Ireland.

Career statistics

References

External links

1996 births
Living people
People from Lurgan
Association footballers from Northern Ireland
Northern Ireland youth international footballers
Northern Ireland under-21 international footballers
Burnley F.C. players
Oldham Athletic A.F.C. players
Dundalk F.C. players
English Football League players
Association football defenders
Crusaders F.C. players
Derry City F.C. players